The Marketing Part Number (MPN) is code that Apple Inc. uses to classify all of its items in a unique way. An MPN can be used to identify a particular configuration of Apple hardware. MPNs are additionally referred to by Apple as order numbers, and part numbers, and model numbers, but are distinct from Apple's "A number" format of model codes.

Typical Marketing Part Numbers are M8738LL/A for a 20 GB iPod, M9454LL/A for a Power Macintosh G5, and MC605FD/A for a 32 GB European iPhone 4.

See also 
 Identifier
 Product code

References

Apple Inc. hardware